"Fantasy" is a song by Russian electronic music band Tesla Boy, released as the lead single from their second studio album, The Universe Made of Darkness (2013). The song was world-premiered on 22 May 2012. An accompanying music video for "Fantasy" was directed by Andrey Krauzov and premiered on 22 October 2012.

Track listing
CD single & Digital download
 "Fantasy" – 3:45

References

2013 singles
Tesla Boy songs
Synth-pop ballads
2013 songs